Ad-Dāmar is the capital of the River Nile state in Sudan. Its famous market, Soug as-Sabit, is the most important in the area. Ad-Dāmar is an example of a Sudanese African-Islamic city founded toward the end of the fifteenth century. Since ad-Damar was located on the bank of the river, it could be expected to exhibit a linear morphology. By 1814, it was a large town, containing about 500 houses. The city was clean and had many new buildings. Houses were uniform in construction and with regular streets with shady trees (Burckhardt, 1980; Crawford, 1951). Ad-Dāmar is linked by road and railway and both transport routes are almost parallel to the Nile River, with nearby ʿAṭbarah and Barbar and with Khartoum. Pop. (2008 prelim.) 73,654.
It is mentioned in some books that Ad-Dāmar is one of the oldest cities in the country and the whole region.

History

Turkish Egyptian rule

In 1821, Ismail Kamel Pasha, the son of Muhammad Ali Pasha, during his invasion to Sudan, sent his ally the leader of the Mirbab tribe, Nasr al-Din al-Sadig, from the city of Berber to Ad-Damar, to urge the elders (Almajazeeb) of the city to offer loyalty to the new ruler of the country. The elders of the city refused to do so and threatened to confront the Basha if their city was entered by his people.
Ismael Kamel Pasha continued to move inwards and moved with his army from Barber to the Horn, where Atbara River meets with the Nile. Ismael Kamel Pasha met Almajazeeb with their neighbors and allies at the Quib area (where there is Atbara bridge currently) and was followed by the Faqih Muhammad bin Faqih Ahmad Ab Jadari. The invasion army used reinforcements from soldiers to defeat the fighters of the Majazeeb. The Majazeeb were defeated, killed and their families, houses and mosques destroyed. Almjazeeb distributed among the areas of Atbara river, Botana, Kassala, and Gedaref. In the end, the Majazeeb left Ad-Dāmar. Ad-Dāmar returned to its former prosperity when the Turks issued a general amnesty for the people of Ad-Dāmar, leaders and Sheikhs. The students started to come back seeking education again. The relationship between the elders of the Damer (Almajazeeb) and the Turkish-Egyptian government improved, even more, when General Gordon Pasha arrived in Sudan, where he was welcomed by them. He ordered the exemption of their leader, the jurist Ahmed bin Jalaluddin, from taxes. He was rewarded with an annual grant of ten pounds.

The Mahdia Revolution
Sheikhs in Ad-Dāmar supported the Mahdia revolution and they did  (the promise) to Khalifa Abdullah Altaeshi and chose to stand by their side in the war against the Turkish rule and engaged in various sites of jihad. A number of people from Ad-Dāmar became leaders in the army of the Mahdia.

Administration
Ad-Damer is the capital of the River Nile state. It consists of seven administrative units:
Ad-Dāmar City Unit.
Unit Sidon.
Al-Atabrawi unit.
Unit of the Nile.
Zaidab unit.
Rescue Unit.
New Manaseer Unit.

References

State capitals in Sudan
River Nile (state)